Umair Mir (born 27 January 1990) is a Pakistani first-class cricketer. He was part of Pakistan's squad for the 2008 Under-19 Cricket World Cup. He made his debut on 13-16 December 2007 at a Quetta vs Islamabad match played at Islamabad, with his last appearance being the Islamabad vs Karachi Blues match played at Islamabad on 31 January- 2 February 2013.

References

External links
 

1990 births
Living people
Pakistani cricketers
Islamabad cricketers
Cricketers from Islamabad